Nina Rodrigues is a municipality in the state of Maranhão in the Northeast region of Brazil.

The municipality lies in the Munim River basin.
The municipality contains part of the  Upaon-Açu/Miritiba/Alto Preguiças Environmental Protection Area, created in 1992. It is named after anthropologist Raimundo Nina Rodrigues, born in nearby Vargem Grande.

See also
List of municipalities in Maranhão

References

Municipalities in Maranhão